Temnora griseata is a moth of the family Sphingidae. It is known from forests from Nigeria to southern Congo, southern Tanzania and Malawi.

The length of the forewings is 25 mm for males and 27 mm for females. There are two forms of the nominate subspecies. The first similar to Temnora livida, but smaller, the forewing inner margin is less sinuate and the forewing upperside has a subapical costal brown patch which is the only distinct marking. The second form has an additional dark oblique line, basally edged with pale grey. The forewing outer margin is sharply spotted with brown on the veins.

Subspecies
Temnora griseata griseata
Temnora griseata oxyptera Rothschild & Jordan, 1916 (Tanzania, Malawi)
Temnora griseata ugandae Carcasson, 1972 (Uganda)

References

Temnora
Moths described in 1903
Lepidoptera of Cameroon
Lepidoptera of the Democratic Republic of the Congo
Lepidoptera of West Africa
Lepidoptera of Uganda
Insects of the Central African Republic
Lepidoptera of the Republic of the Congo
Lepidoptera of Gabon
Lepidoptera of Malawi
Lepidoptera of Tanzania
Lepidoptera of Zambia
Moths of Sub-Saharan Africa